Sanctum may refer to:

Arts and entertainment 
 Sanctum (band), a Swedish band
 Sanctum (film), a 2011 3D action-thriller film
 Sanctum (1998 video game), a digital collectible card game
 Sanctum (2011 video game), a first-person shooter tower defense video game
 Sanctum 2, a 2013 first-person shooter tower defense video game

Other uses 
 Sanctum (company), an American information technology company focused on application security

See also 
 Sanctum sanctorum, a Latin phrase meaning "Holy of Holies"
 Sanctum Sanctorum (Marvel Comics), a fictional building in the Marvel Universe